Bi Bi Shirvan (also Romanized as Bī Bī Shīrvān) is a village in Bagheli-ye Marama Rural District, in the Central District of Gonbad-e Qabus County, Golestan Province, Iran. At the 2006 census, its population was 3,247, in 723 families.

See also 
 Ban Shirvan
 Shirvan

References 

Populated places in Gonbad-e Kavus County